Chocolat may refer to:
 Shokolad, a 1922 novel by Alexander Tarasov-Rodionov
 Chocolat (novel), a 1999 novel by Joanne Harris.
 Chocolat (1988 film), a French film by Claire Denis about a family in Cameroon
 Chocolat (2000 film), an adaptation of the novel, about a woman who opens a chocolaterie
 Chocolat (2016 film), a French film
 Chocolat (manga), a Japanese manga written and illustrated by Eisaku Kubonouchi
 Chocolat (manhwa), a manhwa written by Shin Ji-sang and illustrated by Geo
 Chocolat (singer) (born 1978), Japanese singer
 Chocolat (group), a South Korean girl group
 Chocolat (clown) (c. 1868–1917), French circus artist of Afro-Cuban descent
 Mount Chocolat, a mountain in Les Etchemins Regional County Municipality, Chaudière-Appalaches, Quebec, Canada

See also
 Chocolate (disambiguation)